Glasgow Gaelic School (Scottish Gaelic: Sgoil Ghàidhlig Ghlaschu) is a primary and secondary school in Glasgow, Scotland which teaches through the medium of Scottish Gaelic.  This teaching method is commonly known as Gaelic medium education. The secondary school catchment area serves the whole of Glasgow and the primary school catchment is in the west of the city.

GME primary provision is offered at Bun-Sgoil Sgoil Ghàidhlig Ghlaschu, Glendale Gaelic Primary and Bun-sgoil Ghàidhlig Bhaile a’ Ghobhainn (Govan Gaelic Primary School).

History

The first Gaelic School opened in 1999 as a primary school only: Bun-Sgoil Ghàidhlig Ghlaschu (Glasgow Gaelic Primary School) situated in Ashley Street, Woodlands. As the school roll grew it became necessary to relocate to larger premises. Unused buildings at Berkeley Street, Sandyford (also a site used by Woodside Secondary School until 1999), were identified, and reopened in August 2006 as Glasgow Gaelic School, providing Gaelic medium education for pre-5, primary and secondary pupils.

See also
 Gaelic medium education in Scotland
 Gaelscoileanna for Irish-gaelic medium education in Ireland

References

External links
 Glasgow Gaelic School 
 Glasgow Gaelic School's page on Parentzone Scotland

Primary schools in Glasgow
Scottish Gaelic education
Secondary schools in Glasgow
Scottish Gaelic-language secondary schools
2006 establishments in Scotland
Educational institutions established in 2006